Universal USB Installer (UUI) is an open-source live Linux USB flash drive creation software. It allows users to create a bootable live USB flash drive using an ISO image from a supported Linux distribution, antivirus utility, system tool, or Microsoft Windows installer. The USB boot software can also be used to make Windows 8, 10, or 11 run entirely from USB.

Features
 Creates a bootable live USB flash drive of many Linux distributions
 Optionally create a persistent file for saving changes made from the running environment back to the flash drive.
 Can be used to create a Windows Setup or Windows To Go USB.
 Provides additional information regarding each distribution, including category, website URL, and download link for quick reference
 Use formatting methods that allow the USB flash drive to remain accessible for other storage purposes
 Unsupported or (unlisted) ISO files can also be tried against several unlisted ISO options

Example supported Linux distributions
 Ubuntu, Kubuntu and Xubuntu
 Debian Live
 Linux Mint
 Kali Linux
 OpenSUSE
 Fedora
 Damn Small Linux
 Puppy Linux
 PCLinuxOS
 CentOS
 GParted
 Clonezilla

Reception 
It's FOSS editor wrote that Universal USB Installer is his "favorite tool and is extremely easy to use." Lifehacker called it "useful".

See also
 List of tools to create Live USB systems

References

External links
 

Free system software
Multiboot live USB
Windows-only free software